Jeppe Svend Aage Beck Laursen (1 June 1972) is a Norwegian actor and stuntman. His biggest role was in the historical TV drama The Last Kingdom.

Filmography 
 Vaiana (norsk stemme Maui) (2016)
 Birkebeinerne (2016)
 Kill Buljo 2 (2013)
 Hansel and Gretel: Witch Hunters (2013)
 Hotel Cæsar (2013)
 Labyrint (tv-serie, 2012-2018)
 Tomme Tønner 2 (2011)
 Brødrene Dal og Vikingsverdets Forbannelse (2010)
 Kurt Josef Wagle og legenden om fjordheksa (2010)
 En helt vanlig dag på jobben (2010)
 Snarveien (2009)
 Død snø (2009)
 Hvaler (2008)
 Rovdyr (2008)
 Varg Veum – Tornerose (2008)
 Kalde føtter (2006)
 Ungkarsnissen (2004)
 Hotel Cæsar Season 16, episode 40, "Narkokurer" (2004)
 Verdens beste SFO Kule kidz gråter ikke Downs Of The Dead''  (2019)

References

Living people
Norwegian actors
1972 births